Always Never the Same is the thirteenth studio album by American rock band Kansas, released in 1998.
This album consists of mostly covers of the band’s previous work, re-recorded with the London Symphony Orchestra. New songs include "In Your Eyes", "The Sky Is Falling", "Need to Know" and the instrumental "Preamble". "Prelude & Introduction" is a medley of the Kansas songs "Carry On Wayward Son", "Point of Know Return", "Opus Insert", and "Lamplight Symphony". The album also includes a cover of The Beatles’ "Eleanor Rigby". "Carry On Wayward Son" was also recorded during this time, in case strong sales would bring forth a second symphonic album, but was never released.

Track listing

Personnel
Kansas
Steve Walsh – keyboards, lead vocals
Robby Steinhardt – violin, lead and backing vocals
Rich Williams – guitars, producer
Billy Greer – bass, vocals
Phil Ehart – drums, producer

Additional musicians
The London Symphony Orchestra, arranged and conducted by Larry Baird

Production
Trammell Starks - producer, digital editing
Russ Fowler, James Majors, Jim "Z" Zumpano - engineers
Peter Cobbin - orchestra recordings engineer
Jeff Glixman - mixing at Tree Sound Studios, Atlanta, Georgia
Greg Calbi - mastering at Masterdisk, New York 
Brian Jobson, James Majors - digital editing
Michael Allen - copyist
Pennie Moore, Conni Treantafeles - art direction and design
Marti Griffin - photography

References

Kansas (band) albums
1998 albums
River North Records albums